Two weeks may refer to:
A fortnight
Two Weeks (1920 film), a 1920 American comedy drama starring Constance Talmadge
Two Weeks (2006 film), a 2006 American comedy drama film starring Sally Field
Two Weeks (TV series), a 2013 South Korean television series
"Two Weeks" (The Office), TV series episode
"Two Weeks" (Grizzly Bear song)
"Two Weeks" (All That Remains song)
"Two Weeks" (FKA Twigs song)

See also
14 Days (disambiguation)
Fortnight (disambiguation)